Poghos Poghosyan (1958–September 25, 2001) was an ethnic Armenian from the Javakhk region of Georgia. He was killed at Poplavok cafe in Yerevan on September 25, 2001 by the bodyguards of then President of Armenia Robert Kocharyan. Kocharyan's bodyguards pleaded not guilty to the accusations.

While at the cafe, a seated Poghosyan saw Kocharyan (a former classmate) leaving the cafe with Charles Aznavour and greeted him by saying "Hi Rob" (պրիվետ Ռոբ, privet Rob) as they left. This very casual greeting was taken as an insult by the president, and his bodyguards approached Poghosyan's table and asked to have a word with him. He was taken to the toilet where he was beaten and declared dead 10 minutes later by an ambulance paramedic.

It took days for the media to report on this murder by the president's bodyguard, witnessed by hundreds of people. Human Rights Watch said that witnesses feared coming forward during the trial. The trial was quick, with one of President Kocharyan's bodyguards, Aghamal Harutiunyan, also known as Kuku, charged with involuntary manslaughter. He was sentenced with a year of probation.

After the 2018 Armenian revolution this case was eventually reopened, with testimony by witness Steven Newton, which was not allowed in the original trial. Re-trial arguments are scheduled to be heard beginning February 27, 2020.

On March 7, 2020, Armenian Prime Minister Nikol Pashinyan was on Yerevan's metro handing out booklets supporting a referendum his party had initiated. A young woman tore it up and threw the pieces at him. Pashinyan took it in stride saying to the people around that "This is what democracy is for." He later reflected on the event on Facebook, making a reference to Poghos Poghosyan's murder when he stated “the safety of this young woman is not threatened, she will not be ‘accidentally’ beaten up in the nearest restroom, she will continue to live her usual life, freely express her views...”.

In January 2020, prosecutors asked the Court of Appeals to overturn Aghamal Harutiunyan's guilty verdict and order a retrial. They said there was additional proof that the death was a murder committed by "a group of individuals." On July 6, 2020, the court accepted the request of prosecutors and the case was sent back to Yerevan's court of first instance.

References

1958 births
Armenian murder victims
People murdered in Armenia
Georgian people of Armenian descent
2001 deaths
2000s murders in Armenia
2001 crimes in Armenia
2001 murders in Asia
2001 murders in Europe